Ristolas is a former commune in the Hautes-Alpes department in southeastern France. On 1 January 2019, it was merged into the new commune of Abriès-Ristolas. The village lies in the Queyras, in the northwestern part of the commune, on the left bank of the Guil, which has its source in the southeastern part of the commune.

Population

See also
Communes of the Hautes-Alpes department

References

Former communes of Hautes-Alpes
Populated places disestablished in 2019